Blenniella bilitonensis, also known as Biliton blenniella or the lined rockskipper, is a species of combtooth blenny found in the western Pacific ocean.

References

External links
 

bilitonensis
Fish described in 1858